Bantu Tshintsha Guluva Rovers Football Club is a Zimbabwean football club based in Bulawayo since their recent purchase by a group of businessmen from that city. Prior to that the club was named Eastern Lions Football Club and based in Mutare, Manicaland.

Squad

References

External links
Official Site

 
Sport in Bulawayo
Football clubs in Zimbabwe
2008 establishments in Zimbabwe